Barrière River may refer to:

 Barrière River (Quinze Lake). Quebec
 Barrière River (North Thompson River), British Columbia

See also
 Barrier River, New Zealand